Michael Ludäscher (born 4 May 1988) is a Swiss football defender who plays for FC Schönenwerd-Niedergösgen.

Career 
He was loaned twice during his career to Baden: from 30 March 2008 to the end of the 2007–08 season, and 7 January 2009 to 30 June 2009.

References

External links
FC Baden profile 

1988 births
Living people
Swiss men's footballers
Association football defenders
FC Aarau players
FC Wangen bei Olten players
FC Baden players
FC Gossau players
Swiss Super League players
Swiss Challenge League players
Swiss 1. Liga (football) players
2. Liga Interregional players